Nasirpur may refer to:
 Naserpur, a town in Pakistan
 Nasirpur, Jalandhar, a village in India
 Nasirpur, Sultanpur Lodhi, a village in India
 Nasirpur, a village in Akania Nasirpur, Bangladesh

See also 
 Nasipur